Nebulette is a cardiac-specific isoform belonging to the nebulin family of proteins. It is encoded by the NEBL gene. This family is composed of 5 members: nebulette, nebulin, N-RAP, LASP-1 and LASP-2. Nebulette localizes to Z-discs of cardiac muscle and appears to regulate the length of actin thin filaments.

Structure 

Nebulette is a 116.4 kDa protein composed of 1014 amino acids. As a member of the nebulin family of proteins, nebulette is characterized by 35 amino acid stretches of ‘‘nebulin repeats’’, which are actin binding domains containing a conserved SDxxYK motif. Like nebulin, nebulette has an acidic region with unknown structure at its N-terminus, and a serine-rich region adjacent to an SH3 domain at its C-terminus.  Though nebulette shares structural features with nebulin, nebulin is expressed preferentially in skeletal muscle and has an enormous size (600-900 kDa), while nebulette is expressed in cardiac muscle at Z-disc regions and is significantly smaller (roughly 1/6 of the size). Nebulette interacts with actin, tropomyosin, alpha-actinin. Xin, and XIRP2.

Function 

Nebulette was identified in 1995 by Moncman and Wang using primary cultures of chicken embryonic cardiomyocytes by immunoprecipitations with certain anti-nebulin monoclonal antibodies.  Normal expression of nebulette is essential for the assembly and contractile function of myofibrils. Specifically, nebulette appears to regulate the stability and length of actin thin filaments, as well as beating frequencies of cardiomyocytes; reduction of full-length nebulette protein in cardiomyocytes resulted in reduced thin filament lengths, depressed beating frequencies and loss of thin filament regulatory proteins troponin I and tropomyosin.

Clinical significance 

Mutations in the NEBL gene have been associated with dilated cardiomyopathy. Studies in transgenic mice have supported their causative role in endocardial fibroelastosis and dilated cardiomyopathy.

Further reading

References

External links 
 Mass spectrometry characterization of human NEBL at COPaKB
 

Proteins